Judson College may refer to one of several tertiary institutions:

 Judson College (Alabama), originally named Judson Female Institute
 Judson College (Mount Palatine, Illinois) (1846–1860)
 Judson University, Elgin, Illinois, called Judson College until 2007
 Judson College, forerunner of University of Yangon, Myanmar

See also
 Judson (disambiguation)